The 1941 Sugar Bowl featured the fourth-ranked Tennessee Volunteers and the fifth-ranked Boston College Eagles, both with records of 10–0 and high-scoring  It was played on Wednesday, January 1, 1941, at Tulane Stadium in New Orleans, 

In the seventh Sugar Bowl, Tennessee scored the only points of the first half with a four-yard touchdown run by Van Thompson in the first quarter. After a scoreless second quarter, Boston College scored on a 13-yard touchdown run from Harry Connolly to tie the score at seven each. Tennessee answered with a two-yard touchdown run from Warren Buist for a 13–7 lead. Boston College scored on a one-yard rushing touchdown from Mike Holovak to tie the game at 

In the fourth quarter, Tennessee's Bob Foxx missed a short field goal attempt with three minutes remaining, and BC took over on its own twenty.  Quarterback Charlie O'Rourke led the Eagles on an eighty-yard drive, capped with his 24-yard touchdown run to give them a

References

Sugar Bowl
Sugar Bowl
Boston College Eagles football bowl games
Tennessee Volunteers football bowl games
Sugar Bowl
Sugar Bowl